Anssi is a given name. Notable people with the name include:

Anssi Jaakkola (born 1987), Finnish footballer
Anssi Joutsenlahti, pensioned vicar and a member of the parliament of Finland
Anssi Juutilainen (born 1956), Finnish ski-orienteering competitor and world champion
Anssi Karttunen (born 1960), Finnish cellist
Anssi Kela (born 1972), Finnish singer-songwriter multi-instrumentalist who has published five albums
Anssi Kippo (born 1976), platinum-selling Finnish producer who founded Astia-studios in 1994
Anssi Koivuranta (born 1988), ski jumper, formerly Nordic combined skier from Finland
Anssi Löfman, Finnish ice hockey player who currently plays professionally in Finland
Anssi Melametsä (born 1961), retired professional ice hockey player
Anssi Rantanen, Finnish ice hockey defenceman who currently plays professionally in Finland
Anssi Salmela (born 1984), Finnish professional ice hockey defenceman
Anssi Viren (born 1977), Finnish football player

ANSSI may also refer to:
 Agence nationale de la sécurité des systèmes d'information (National Cybersecurity Agency of France)

See also
ANSI (disambiguation)
Anisi
Anissa (disambiguation)
Ansa (disambiguation)
Anse (disambiguation)
Ansei
Anzi (disambiguation)

References